Ninth Step Station is a cyberpunk buddy cop crime drama series published by Serial Box. Its authors include Malka Older, Fran Wilde, Jacqueline Koyanagi, and Curtis C. Chen. The plot focuses on an American lieutenant who is sent to work with the Tokyo Police Force after a war divides Tokyo between Chinese and American control. Emma Higashi (the American officer) works with Miyako Koreda (a Japanese investigator) to solve crimes throughout the city. The first season was released in March 2019, and the production has been renewed for a second season.

Plot Summary
After China invades Japan, Tokyo is divided between American and Chinese control. A fragile balance of power develops. Emma Higashi, an American Peacekeeper, is assigned to work with Miyako Koreda of the Tokyo Police in an effort to warm international relations. Emma assists the Tokyo police department in investigating crimes. Though they are initially incompatible, Emma and Miyako develop a friendship.

Throughout the first season, tensions arise between organized crime syndicates, the Chinese government, American peacekeeping forces, the Japanese government, and Japanese Resistance fighters opposed to foreign occupation. These groups fight for control of a divided Tokyo, leaving Emma and Miyako caught in the crossfire. As the fragile political system deteriorates, Emma and Miyako must work together to prevent international incidents. Eventually, high-ranking politicians are assassinated and China invades Tokyo's buffer zones in a bid for more power, sparking an outright war.

Reception
The series received praise for the realism and political complexity of the setting, comparing Tokyo's presentation with the division of East and West Berlin during the Cold War. The use of drone technology, body modification, and advanced forensic technology were also praised for their present-day social relevance.

The series was also praised for its high-quality sound design and narration. Some reviewers believed that the overarching narrative was compelling but criticized the simplicity of the individual criminal cases. Other reviews highlighted the complex issues explored in the series, including misogyny, colonialism, and racism.

List of Episodes

References

2019 science fiction novels
Crime drama
Cyberpunk novels
Science fiction novel series